Macondo (Moxico) is a town and commune of Angola, located in the province of Moxico.

References 

Populated places in Moxico Province